Brian Keith Mitchell (born December 13, 1968) is an American football coach and former professional cornerback who played three seasons for the Atlanta Falcons in the National Football League (NFL). Mitchell is the coach cornerbacks coach at North Carolina State University.

Professional career
Mitchell was drafted by the Atlanta Falcons in the seventh round (172nd overall) of the 1991 NFL Draft.

External links
 NC State profile
 East Carolina profile
 

1968 births
Living people
African-American coaches of American football
African-American players of American football
American football cornerbacks
Atlanta Falcons players
BYU Cougars football coaches
BYU Cougars football players
Coaches of American football from Indiana
Coaches of American football from Texas
East Carolina Pirates football coaches
NC State Wolfpack football coaches
Players of American football from Indianapolis
Players of American football from Texas
Sportspeople from Waco, Texas
Texas Tech Red Raiders football coaches
Virginia Tech Hokies football coaches
West Virginia Mountaineers football coaches